Zhang Jilin (born June 24, 1986) is a Chinese and Australian chess player holding the title of Woman Grandmaster (WGM). She competed in the Women's World Chess Championship in 2008.

Career 
Zhang Jilin first represented China in the World Youth Chess Festival in Menorca in 1996. She played then three times subsequently at the World Girls U-20 Championship in 2004, 2005 and 2006, finishing in the top ten on all three occasions.

In June 2007, she qualified for the Woman Grandmaster title. She earned the required norms at:

 2002 China Women's Team Championship in Beihai, China (February 5–17); score 7/9
 2006 World Junior Chess Championship (Girls) in Yerevan, Armenia (October 3–16, 2006); score 7/11
 3rd Singapore Masters International Open in Singapore (December 26–30, 2006); score 5/9

In 2008 Zhang qualified from the Chinese Zonal tournament to play in the Women's World Chess Championship in Nalchik, Russia. She was knocked out in the first round by Inna Gaponenko.
 
She was awarded the International Arbiter title in 2010. Zhang moved with her family to Sydney in 2016 and in August 2017, Zhang switched her national federation from China to Australia.

In 2018 Zhang was selected to play for the Australian team at the Batumi Chess Olympiad on third board.

In the China Chess League, Zhang played for Shandong team, which won the gold medal in 2007 and 2010.

References

External links

Jilin Zhang chess gales at 365Chess.com

Zhang Jilin team chess record at Olimpbase.org
Zhang Jilin's official website (in Chinese)
Title Application for International Arbiter (IA)

1986 births
Living people
Chess woman grandmasters
Chess players from Harbin
Australian female chess players
Australian people of Chinese descent
Chess arbiters